Spring Lake is a commuter railroad station in the borough of Spring Lake, Monmouth County, New Jersey, United States. Located near the border with Spring Lake Heights, trains are served by New Jersey Transit's North Jersey Coast Line, which serve stations from New York Penn Station, Hoboken Terminal and Long Branch to Bay Head. The next station northward is Belmar, while the next station south is Manasquan. Spring Lake station lacks accessibility for handicapped persons per the Americans With Disabilities Act of 1990.

Service through Spring Lake began on October 11, 1875, when the New York and Long Branch Railroad was extended south from Ocean Beach station (now Belmar) to Sea Girt. Spring Lake station was built on property of William V. Reid, a local landowner. In May 2011, ticket vending machines were installed at the east side of the Spring Lake station.

Station layout	
The station has two low-level asphalt side platforms.

Bibliography

References

External links

 Station from Warren Avenue from Google Maps Street View

Railway stations in Monmouth County, New Jersey
NJ Transit Rail Operations stations
Stations on the North Jersey Coast Line
Spring Lake, New Jersey
Former New York and Long Branch Railroad stations
Railway stations in the United States opened in 1875
1875 establishments in New Jersey